The Arrondissement of Mechelen is one of the three administrative arrondissements in the Province of Antwerp, Belgium. It is both an administrative and a judicial arrondissement, as the territory for both coincides.

History

The Arrondissement of Mechelen was created in 1800 as the third arrondissement in the Department of Deux-Nèthes. It originally comprised the cantons of Duffel, Heist-op-den-Berg, Lier, Mechelen and Puurs. In 1977, the then municipality of Muizen was added to the arrondissement from the Arrondissement of Leuven, and was merged into the City of Mechelen.

Per 1 January 2019, the municipalities of Puurs and Sint-Amands merged into the new municipality of Puurs-Sint-Amands.

Municipalities

The Administrative Arrondissement of Mechelen consists of the following municipalities:

 Berlaar
 Bonheiden
 Bornem
 Duffel
 Heist-op-den-Berg
 Lier

 Mechelen
 Nijlen
 Putte
 Puurs-Sint-Amands
 Sint-Katelijne-Waver
 Willebroek

References

Mechelen